Valentine's Day is an American sitcom that aired on ABC from September 18, 1964 until May 7, 1965. The series starred Tony Franciosa as Valentine Farrow, a swinging Manhattan publishing executive, and Jack Soo (later of Barney Miller) as Rocky Sin, a poker-playing con-artist and Farrow's valet.  The show was created by Hal Kanter and lasted only one season.

One noteworthy episode was produced as a tie-in to the movie Rio Conchos,  in which Franciosa co-starred; he played both Valentine and his character, Juan Luis Martinez, from the feature.

Cast
 Anthony Franciosa as Valentine Farrow
 Jack Soo as Rockwell "Rocky" Sin
 Janet Waldo as Libby Freeman
 Jerry Hausner as O.D. Dunstall
 Mimi Dillard as Molly
 Eddie Quillan as Grover Cleveland Fipple
 Jim Nabors as Hank Smith
 Bill Bixby as Carl Pierce

Episodes

External links
 

1960s American sitcoms
1964 American television series debuts
1965 American television series endings
American Broadcasting Company original programming
Black-and-white American television shows
English-language television shows
Television series by 20th Century Fox Television
Television shows set in New York City